Alexander James Brooker (born 15 May 1984) is an English journalist and presenter best known for his television work with Channel 4.

Since 2012, Brooker has co-hosted The Last Leg, a Channel 4 panel show with Adam Hills and Josh Widdicombe as well as co-presenting Channel 4 ski jumping show The Jump with Davina McCall in 2014. In 2016, he began presenting The Superhumans Show for Channel 4 daytime.

In February 2018 Brooker signed with Leeds Rhinos' Foundation PDRL (Physical Disability Rugby League) team.

Career
Brooker went to the Norton Knatchbull School in Ashford, Kent, before graduating from Liverpool John Moores University in 2006 and worked as a sports reporter on the Liverpool Echo. He now works for the Press Association.

Brooker entered Channel 4's Half a Million Quid Talent Search in 2012, which aimed to find disabled talent for coverage of the 2012 Summer Paralympic Games and beyond. He first appeared as a trackside reporter on Channel 4's coverage of the 2011 BT Paralympic World Cup. Brooker interviewed the likes of Boris Johnson and David Cameron during the 2012 Summer Paralympics opening ceremony and was a co-host on The Last Leg with Adam Hills, a nightly alternative look at the Games.
Brooker was also on The Last Leg of the Year, an end of year special with Adam Hills and Josh Widdicombe.

Since 25 January 2013, Brooker has been a co-host on The Last Leg on Channel 4. In February 2015 Brooker interviewed Nick Clegg for the programme: his performance was described by political journalist Hugo Rifkind as "a model of how to talk normally to a politician – and make them talk normally back".

On 1 August 2013, Brooker hosted a one-off documentary about body image on Channel 4, titled Alex Brooker: My Perfect Body.

In January and February 2014, Brooker co-presented the first series of celebrity reality show The Jump on Channel 4 opposite Davina McCall. The series was broadcast live over 10 nights from a mountainside in Austria. However, Brooker did not return for the second series in 2015. In 2016, he presented The Superhumans Show on Channel 4.

In 2020 and beyond, he co-hosts One Night In with Josh Widdicombe

In May 2022 the BBC announced that Brooker would be one of the guest presenters to take over Richard Osman's role on Pointless.

Personal life
Brooker was born in Croydon. He was born with congenital abnormalities of his hand and arm, and a twisted right leg which had to be amputated when he was a baby. He now wears a prosthetic leg.

In 2014 Brooker married accountant Lynsey, and the couple have two daughters.

Brooker is a supporter of Arsenal F.C., appearing regularly on the  Footballistically Arsenal podcast.

Charity
In May 2014, Brooker fronted a campaign called "End The Awkward" by disability charity Scope, which used comedy to shine a light on the awkwardness that many people feel about disability. Brooker appeared in three advertisements guiding viewers through awkward situations that they may encounter with a disabled person.

In September 2012, Brooker won The Million Pound Drop Live with Josh Widdicombe playing for Echoes Foundation, Scope Joseph's Goal.

Brooker is the official ambassador of UK-based charity Legs4Africa.

Filmography
Television
Half a Million Quid Talent Search (2012)
The Last Leg (2012–)
Alex Brooker: My Perfect Body (2013)
The Jump (2014)
The Superhumans Show (2016–)
The NHS: A People's History (2018)
Very British Problems (2018)
Alex Brooker: Disability and Me (2020)
One Night In (2021)
Hobby Man (2022)

Guest appearances
The Million Pound Drop Live (September 2012) – Contestant with Josh Widdicombe
Alan Carr's Grand National Specstacular (19 March 2013) – Guest
Sunday Brunch (28 July 2013) – Guest
Celebrity Fifteen to One (20 September 2013, 13 June 2014) – Contestant
8 Out of 10 Cats (18 October 2013, 8 November 2013, 14 April 2014, 4 November 2014, 27 June 2017, 15 April 2019) – Panellist
Never Mind the Buzzcocks (18 November 2013, 14 October 2014) – Guest
Fake Reaction (23 January 2014) – Panellist
Virtually Famous (4 August 2014) – Panellist
Celebrity Juice (11 September 2014) – Guest
The Chase: Celebrity Special (20 September 2014) – Contestant
Celebrity Squares (15 October 2014) – Guest
The Apprentice: You're Fired! (5 November 2014) – Panellist
Britain's Got More Talent (28 May 2015) – Panellist
8 Out of 10 Cats Does Countdown (28 August 2015) – Panellist
Celebrity Benchmark (23 October 2015) – Contestant, won £6,000 for charity
All Star Mr & Mrs (25 November 2015) – Contestant
Would I Lie to You? (13 January 2016) – Contestant
Sunday Brunch (6 March 2016)
Duck Quacks Don't Echo
Very British Problems (2015–2016) – Interviewee
John Bishop: In Conversation With... (2016) – Interviewee (Series 1 Episode 4)
 Alex Brooker: Disability and Me (2020) – Presenter
Tipping Point: Lucky Stars (11 October 2020) – Contestant
Richard Osman's House of Games (11–15 January 2021) – Contestant
Redknapp's Big Night Out (27 May 2021) – Guest
Big Zuu's Big Eats (25 July 2022) – Guest
Pointless (7–21 February 2022) – Guest co-host

References

External links
 
 
 

1984 births
Living people
Alumni of Liverpool John Moores University
Channel 4 people
Comedians from London
Television presenters with disabilities
English amputees
English journalists
English people with disabilities
English satirists
English television presenters
People educated at The Norton Knatchbull School
People from Croydon